Lee Holsgrove (born 13 December 1979) is an English former professional footballer who played as a defender.

Career
Born in Wendover, Holsgrove played for Millwall, Wycombe Wanderers, Aldershot Town, Hayes and Windsor & Eton.

Personal life
His father John and two brothers Paul and Peter were also all footballers.

References

1979 births
Living people
English footballers
Millwall F.C. players
Wycombe Wanderers F.C. players
Aldershot Town F.C. players
Hayes F.C. players
Windsor & Eton F.C. players
English Football League players
Association football defenders